The women's high jump competition at the 2017 World Championships in Athletics was held at the London Olympic Stadium on .

Summary
In the final, three were perfect to 1.95 metres, 2017 number one Mariya Lasitskene, competing as an Authorised Neutral Athlete, Yuliya Levchenko (UKR) and Marie-Laurence Jungfleisch (GER). Three others made it over 1.95 metres to stay in the competition. At 1.97 metres, both Lasitskene and Levchenko remained perfect. On her final attempt Kamila Lićwinko (POL) made it to define the medalists. Lićwinko mixed up the order by jumping 1.99 metres on her first attempt. Levchenko remained perfect to hold the lead, but when Lasitskene missed her first attempt, she dropped to third. Strategically passing to 2.01 metres, Lasitskene cleared it on her first attempt after Lićwinko had missed, to move into silver medal position. That turned into gold after Levchenko missed her first attempt. Lićwinko missed her second attempt and dropped to bronze when Levchenko made hers. Lićwinko passed for one heroic jump at 2.03 metres for the win. She missed, Lasitskene made it, then Levchenko missed three in a row to end the competition. Lasitskene took three shots at 2.08 metres.

Lasitskene was the first Authorised Neutral Athlete to win a gold medal. For the medal ceremony, the IAAF anthem was played as a substitute.

Records
Before the competition records were as follows:

No records were set at the competition.

Qualification standard
The standard to qualify automatically for entry was 1.94 metres.

Schedule
The event schedule, in local time (UTC+1), is as follows:

Results

Qualification
The qualification round took place on 10 August, in two groups, both starting at 19:10. Athletes attaining a mark of 1.94 metres ( Q ) or at least the 12 best performers ( q ) qualified for the final. The overall results were as follows:

Final
The final took place on 12 August at 19:05. The results were as follows:

References

High jump
High jump at the World Athletics Championships
Women's sport in London